Poulin is a surname, and may refer to:
 Alfred Poulin (1938-1996), American poet and translator (e.g. Rilke)
 Bernard Poulin (born 1945), Canadian visual artist
 Charles Poulin (born 1972), Canadian ice hockey player
 Dave Poulin (born 1958), Canadian ice hockey player
 François Poulin de Francheville (1692–1733), Montreal merchant
 Jacques Poulin (born 1937), Canadian novelist 
 Joseph-Napoléon Poulin (1821–1892), French physician and political figure
 Kevin Poulin (born 1990), Canadian ice hockey player
 Marie-Paule Poulin (born 1945), Canadian senator and President of the Liberal Party of Canada
 Marie-Philip Poulin (born 1991), Canadian women's ice hockey player
 Mike Poulin (born 1985), Canadian lacrosse player
 Georges Poulin (1887-1971), Canadian ice hockey player
 Patrick Poulin (born 1973), Canadian ice hockey player
 Mike Poulin (born 1983), American musician

See also
 Poulain
 Poulenc

French-language surnames